There are several Serbian communities in South America.

Notable people

Miguel Avramovic (born 1981), Argentinian footballer, paternal family emigrated from Serbia during World War II.
Gastón Bojanich (born 1985), Argentinian footballer.
Marcelo Burzac (born 1988), Argentinian footballer.
Jorge Capitanich (born 1964), Argentinian politician, parents from Banjani, Montenegro.
Gloria Ana Chevesich (born 1958), Chilean judge, paternal Serb descent.
Eleodoro Damianovich (1843–1925), Argentine doctor.
Andrea Jeftanovic (born 1970), Chilean sociologist and author, Croatian Serb father.
Blagoje Jovović (1922–1999), Chetnik fighter, emigrated to Argentine after World War II.
Bora Milutinović (born 1944), Serbian football manager, former player, expatriated to many South American countries.
Sergio Mihanovich (1937–2012), Argentine jazz musician, Croat father and Serb mother.

Claudia Pavlovich Arellano (born 1969), Chilean politician, paternal Serb descent.
Nicolás Pavlovich (born 1978), Argentine footballer, Montenegrin ancestry.
Dejan Petković (born 1972), Serbian football manager, former player, expatriated to Brazil.
 Vladica Popović (1935–2020), footballer Olympic medalist, migrated in Venezuela

Miguel Socolovich (born 1986), Venezuelan baseballer.
Milan Stojadinović (1888–1961), Serbian politician, advisor to Argentine governments, emigrated in 1946.
Lyanco (born 1997), Brazilian footballer, Serbian paternal grandfather.
Miloš Vukasović/Miguel Vucassovich (1842–1908), shipbuilder, migrated to Argentine in 1865.
Paola Vukojicic (born 1974), retired Argentine female field hockey player.
Geraldine Zivic (born 1975), Argentine-born Colombian actress, paternal family emigrated from Serbia during World War II.

See also
Serbian Orthodox Eparchy of Buenos Aires and South America
Serbs in USA
Serbs in Canada
St. Sava's Serbian Orthodox Seminary
New Gračanica Monastery
Monastery of St. Paisius, Safford
Saint Petka Serbian Orthodox Church
St. Pachomious Monastery

References

Sources

External links

 
South America
South American people of European descent